The Gibson Firebird is a solid-body electric guitar manufactured by Gibson beginning in 1963.

History
The Gibson Guitar Corporation released several new styles during the 1950s to compete with Fender's solid-body instruments, such as the Telecaster and Stratocaster. After success with the Les Paul in the 1950s, Gibson's popularity began to wane in the 1960s.  Fender's colors, shapes and multiple pickups were endorsed by notable guitarists. Gibson's guitars, most of which were hollow or semi-hollow designs, seemed old-fashioned. Coupled with higher prices, this contributed to a decline in sales.

Gibson had made forays into radical body shapes — the Flying V and Explorer in the 1950s — which met limited initial success. The president of Gibson, Ted McCarty, hired car designer Ray Dietrich to design a guitar that would have popular appeal. Under Dietrich, the Firebird took on the lines of mid-50s car tailfins.  Dietrich took the Explorer design and rounded the edges. The most unusual aspect is that the guitar is "backward" in that the right-hand (treble) horn of the body is longer than the other. Thus, the original Firebirds were unofficially referred to as "reverse".

The Firebird is the first Gibson solid-body to use neck-through construction, wherein the neck extended to the tail end of the body.  The neck itself is made up of five plies of mahogany interspersed with four narrow strips of walnut for added strength.  Other features were reverse headstock (with the tuners on the treble side) and "banjo"-style planetary geared tuning keys. The special original Gibson Firebird humbucking pickup(s) — single, dual or triple — were smaller footprint versions of standard Gibson humbucking pickups, but were unique in that inside each of their smaller bobbins contained an alnico bar magnet (standard humbucking pickups AND mini-humbucking pickups have one bar magnet that activates the six iron slug poles of one bobbin, and six iron screw poles of the other bobbin).  Original Firebird pickups were also built without any specific bobbin fasteners — their bobbins (and possible "reflector" plate under the bobbins) were held onto the frame during both the wax potting process (to reduce/eliminate feedback and unwanted noise) and the solid metal cover that was soldered to the frame base. There are no screw poles on Firebird pickups. Some Firebirds from 1965 featured Gibson's single-coil P-90 pickup.

The Firebird line went on sale in mid-1963 with four models distinguished by pickup and tailpiece configurations (see below).  Unlike the Les Paul and SG line, which used the terms "Junior", "Special", "Standard" and "Custom", the Firebird used the Roman numerals "I", "III", "V" and "VII". Gibson's line of Thunderbird basses is rooted in the design of the Firebird, and uses even Roman numerals ("II" and "IV") to distinguish it.  From 1965 to 1969, Gibson introduced "non-reverse" models after failing to achieve marketing success with the unusual reverse-body design.  Gibson had also received complaints from Fender that the Firebird headstock mirrored the Stratocaster and that the body violated Fender's design patents, with Fender threatening a lawsuit. The "non-reverse" body is a more standard double-cutaway design, with the bass horn being longer than the treble horn and the headstock having the tuners mounted on the bass side.  It also had a standard glued-in ("set") neck rather than neck-through construction, as well as other, less noticeable changes in design and build. Pickup and tailpiece configuration for the V and VII were the same as the earlier "reverse" models, although the I- and III-models were now shipped with two or three P-90 pickups and plain vibratos.  After a few years of disappointing sales, the "non-reverse" line was dropped.  "Reverse" body Firebirds were first reissued in 1972, with a commemorative "Bicentennial" model released in 1976 which was made available in a variety of finishes including black, vintage white, natural, and the traditional sunburst.  The bicentennial model was also distinguished by gold hardware and a red-white-blue logo on the white pickguard.  The logo on most other models is red.

Reissues

The "reissue" Firebirds are usually based on the original reverse body design, though Gibson reintroduced the non-reverse Firebird in 2002 as a Custom Shop guitar. Epiphone, owned by Gibson, has also issued several models.

Beginning in 2010, Gibson stated that they would no longer be creating banjo tuners for the Firebird.

Gibson reissues of the Firebird do not use the same pickup build that was originally introduced in 1963. The modern Firebird pickups have a higher output volume, more midrange, and less treble than the original design.

Configurations

Firebird I – One pickup. Combination stud bridge/tailpiece. Nickel hardware. Dot inlays, no neck binding.
Firebird II Artist CMT – A limited-production instrument from the early 1980s; features a maple top, mahogany body, set mahogany neck, two standard-sized humbuckers, and toggle switches to control active Moog electronic tone controls.
Firebird III – Two pickups, stud bridge/tailpiece and Gibson Vibrola (player could choose to use the stud or Vibrola). Nickel hardware. Dot inlays and neck binding.
Firebird V – Two pickups, Tune-o-matic bridge with Maestro "Lyre" Vibrola; reissues feature a stop-bar tailpiece. Nickel hardware. Trapezoid inlays and neck binding.
Firebird VII – Three pickups, Tune-o-matic bridge and Maestro "Lyre" Vibrola tailpiece. Gold hardware. Block inlays and neck binding.
Firebird Studio - Two P90 pickups, Tune-o-matic bridge with stop-bar tailpiece.  Chrome hardware.  Set neck.  Dot inlay.  No binding.  Reverse body/non-reverse headstock.
Firebird Studio T – Two standard-sized Alnico humbuckers, Tune-o-matic bridge with stop-bar tailpiece. Chrome or gold hardware. Set neck. Dot inlays and no neck binding.
Firebird XII – A two-pickup, twelve-string non-reverse Firebird.
Non-Reverse Firebird – Collectors' term for a Firebird I, III, V or VII featuring a headstock with the tuners on the bass side, and a body having the bass side horn slightly longer than the treble side horn.
Firebird X – Three pickups, automatic 3×3 tuners, on-board digital effects and processing/output, dot-inlays, and has very little resemblance to any other Firebird models.
Firebird Zero – Two Pickups, glued set-neck, dot inlay, 11 different finishes, Korean made potentiometers, significantly cheaper than other Gibson brand models, resemblance to non-reverse Firebird models.
Firebird Tribute – Part of the "Tribute" series.  Features two Firebird style mini humbucker pickups, Tune-o-matic bridge with stop-bar tailpiece, mini tuners, Chrome hardware, four control pots (two volume two tone) and a reverse headstock.  Available in Satin Cherry finish.

Firebird X mass destruction
In July 2019, A former Gibson employee released a video purporting to show the destruction of several hundred Firebird X guitars by driving a tracked excavator over them. The video was met with incredulity and speculation about the true reason for the destruction.

References

Bibliography

Further reading

External links

 

1963 musical instruments
F